Bell Place–Locust Avenue Historic District is a national historic district located at Yonkers, Westchester County, New York. It includes 11 contributing buildings.  They are residential structures and outbuildings representative of the High Victorian, Italian Villa, and Second Empire styles.  They were built between 1855 and 1887 and consists of medium-sized, single family residences, between two and three stories in height.  Some have extant carriage houses on their properties.

It was added to the National Register of Historic Places in 1985.

References

External links

Bell Place–Locust Avenue Historic District Map (LivingPlaces.com)

Houses on the National Register of Historic Places in New York (state)
Historic districts on the National Register of Historic Places in New York (state)
Italianate architecture in New York (state)
Second Empire architecture in New York (state)
Victorian architecture in New York (state)
Buildings and structures in Yonkers, New York
Houses in Westchester County, New York
National Register of Historic Places in Yonkers, New York
Historic districts in Yonkers, New York